Volunteers  is a Soviet feature film released in 1958. It is based on the poetic novel of same name by Yevgeniy Dolmatovsky.

Plot
The film takes place during the 1930s to 1950s. Three inseparable male friends – Kaitanov, Ufimtsev, and Akishin – voluntarily became the first builders of the Moscow Metro. The film also tells the story of the friendship between three women: Olya, Masha, and Tanya. The main themes of the movie include the labor front, Spanish volunteer brigades, World War II, and post-war labor in peacetime. The film shows a variety of emotions: joy and sorrow, victory and loss, love and happiness.

Cast
 Mikhail Ulyanov as Nikolai Kaitanov
 Pyotr Shcherbakov as  Vyacheslav Ufimtsev
 Leonid Bykov as Aleksei Akishin
 Elina Bystritskaya as Olga Teplova, Kaitanov's wife 
 Lyudmila Krylova as Masha Suvorova, pilot-paratrooper
 Mikaela Drozdovskaya as Tanya, Ufimtsev's wife
 Maria Vinogradova as Sergeant Valya Kukhnarenko
 Lyudmila Ivanova as  Komsomol's member
 Lyudmila Marchenko as Kaitanov Jr.'s girlfriend
 Svetlana Kharitonova as military regulator
 Nonna Mordyukova as subway builder

Awards
 All-Union Film Festival — Third Prize

References

External links 

 Великие советские фильмы. 100 фильмов, ставших легендами

Soviet drama films
1958 drama films
1958 films
Gorky Film Studio films
Films based on Russian novels
1950s Russian-language films